Patella variabilis is a species of sea snail, a true limpet, a marine gastropod mollusk in the family Patellidae, one of the families of true limpets.

Subspecies
 Patella (Patella) variabilis f. concolor Krauss, C.F., 1848 
 Patella (Patella) variabilis f. constellata  G.B. Sowerby I 
 Patella (Patella) variabilis f. asciolata  Tomlin, J.R. le B 
 Patella (Patella) variabilis f. polygramma  Tomlin, J.R. le B

Description

Distribution

References

External links

Patellidae
Gastropods described in 1848
Taxa named by Christian Ferdinand Friedrich Krauss